The 2006 Egypt Cup Final was the 74th final of the Egypt Cup, Africa's oldest football cup competition. It was played on 16 June 2006 at Cairo Stadium in Cairo and was contested between Al Ahly and Zamalek. The winners would have entered the 2007 CAF Confederation Cup if they had not already qualified. However, since Al Ahly and Zamalek already qualified for the 2007 CAF Champions League, the Confederation Cup entry went to Ismaily, as they achieved the fourth place in the league.

Route to the final

Details

References

2005–06 in Egyptian football
Al Ahly SC matches
Zamalek SC matches

2006